The Secret of the Duchess is a 1923 German silent drama film directed by Klaus Albrecht and starring Nils Asther, Stella Arbenina and Arnold Korff.

Cast
 Nils Asther
 Stella Arbenina
 Arnold Korff
 Theodor Berthels
 Agda Nilsson
 Hans Laskus
 Paul Rehkopf
 Claus Tiedke

References

Bibliography
 Hans J. Wollstein. Strangers in Hollywood: the history of Scandinavian actors in American films from 1910 to World War II. Scarecrow Press, 1994.

External links

1923 films
Films of the Weimar Republic
German silent feature films
German black-and-white films
1920s German films